Baulch Peak is a peak  northeast of Claydon Peak, marking the extremity of a spur descending north from Prince Andrew Plateau, Queen Elizabeth Range. It was named by the Advisory Committee on Antarctic Names for DeeWitt M. Baulch, a United States Antarctic Research Program meteorologist at South Pole Station, 1958.

References 

Mountains of the Ross Dependency
Shackleton Coast